Edward Noel Evans (7 December 1911 – 12 February 1964) was an English first-class cricketer.

The son of Edward William Evans, he was born at Edmonton in December 1911. He was educated at Haileybury, before going up to Wadham College, Oxford. While studying at Oxford, he played first-class cricket for Oxford University, making his debut against Lancashire at Oxford in 1931. He played first-class cricket for Oxford until losing his place in the side in 1933, having made 21 appearances. He scored 613 runs for Oxford, at an average of 18.57 and a high score of 91. In 1934, he made a first-class appearance for the Marylebone Cricket Club against Ireland at Dublin. 

Evans married Audrey Mary Leathers, the daughter of Frederick Leathers, 1st Viscount Leathers in July 1938. He served in the Second World War with the Royal Naval Volunteer Reserve and was mentioned in dispatches in May 1944. He spent his working life in the family publishing business. Evans died at Kensington in February 1964.

References

External links

1911 births
1964 deaths
Military personnel from Middlesex
Royal Navy officers
People from Edmonton, London
People educated at Haileybury and Imperial Service College
Alumni of Wadham College, Oxford
English cricketers
Oxford University cricketers
Marylebone Cricket Club cricketers
Royal Naval Volunteer Reserve personnel of World War II
Royal Navy officers of World War II